Addison Whittaker Richards, Jr. (October 20, 1902 – March 22, 1964) was an American actor of film and television. Richards appeared in more than three hundred films between 1933 and his death.

Biography
A native of Zanesville, Ohio, Richards was the son of Mr. and Mrs. Addison Richards. His grandfather was a mayor of Zanesville. Following his father's death in 1942, the family moved to California.

Richards was cast in many television series, including the syndicated 1950s crime drama, Sheriff of Cochise, starring John Bromfield. From 1955 to 1961, he appeared in six episodes in different roles on the NBC anthology series, The Loretta Young Show.

In 1956 Richards appeared as Doc Jennings in an uncredited role in the western movie The Fastest Gun Alive starring Glenn Ford. However, he often had more substantial supporting roles in films, especially Westerns, including playing George Armstrong Custer in Badlands of Dakota (1941) and the marshal in The Broken Star (1956). 

From 1957-1958, he appeared in the recurring role of  J.B. Barker in nine episodes of Jackie Cooper's NBC sitcom, The People's Choice. In 1958, he was cast as Warden Johnson in the episode "Dead Reckoning" on the ABC/Warner Brothers western series, Colt .45.

In 1957, in the first of three appearances on Dale Robertson's NBC western series, Tales of Wells Fargo, Richards played Governor Lew Wallace in the episode entitled, "Billy the Kid". Richards played the role of Evanson in the 1957 episode "Venus of Park Avenue" on the CBS crime drama, Richard Diamond, Private Detective.

In 1958 and 1959, Richards was cast as Doc Jay Calhoun in seven episodes, one uncredited, of the CBS western series, Trackdown.

In 1959, Richards portrayed Mayor Thurston in the episode "Traildust" of CBS's western series, The Texan, starring Rory Calhoun. He was cast that same year as Martin Kingsley in two episodes of the NBC western series, Cimarron City. He appeared as Doc Gamble in three episodes of the radio series made briefly into a 1959 NBC sitcom, Fibber McGee and Molly. From 1960 to 1961, he appeared as Doc Landy in eight episodes of the NBC western series, the Deputy, with Henry Fonda and Allen Case.

Richards portrayed Mark Stacy in the 1960 episode "Dennis and the Bees" of the CBS sitcom, Dennis the Menace, starring Jay North. He guest starred as Judge Danby in the 1961 episode "The Best Policy" of another NBC western series, The Tall Man. Also, in 1961, in the TV series Rawhide, he played Frank Miller in the episode "Incident of the Running Iron".

Richards was cast in two episodes of the ABC sitcom, The Real McCoys: as R.T. Overland in "Weekend in Los Angeles" (1960) and as Colonel Martin in "You Can't Beat the Army" (1961). In 1961, he appeared in different roles in two episodes of the CBS crime drama, Checkmate. He was cast as an immigration officer in the 1962 episode "Mi's Citizenship" of the NBC family drama, National Velvet.

For the summer of 1962, Richards joined the summer stock cast at Denver's Elitch Theatre and appeared in shows including Auntie Mame and The Best Man.

Richards appeared on the CBS sitcoms, Pete and Gladys and in 1963 as Dean Hollister in The Many Loves of Dobie Gillis, starring Dwayne Hickman. He was cast as Frank Newton on an episode of Petticoat Junction in October 1963. He was cast twice in 1964 on CBS's The Beverly Hillbillies, with Buddy Ebsen. His last television role was as Colonel Saunders in the 1964 episode "The Permanent Recruit" of ABC's No Time for Sergeants, loosely based on the Andy Griffith film of the same name.

Personal life
Richards met Vivian Eccles in late 1929, marrying a year later and later had one child, daughter Ann.

Richards died of a heart attack. His interment is at Oak Park Cemetery in Claremont, California. (A news story in the March 26, 1964, issue of the Santa Cruz Sentinel says that services were held at Forest Lawn Memorial Park.)

Selected filmography

Riot Squad (1933) - Diamonds Jareck
Lone Cowboy (1933) - Dobe Jones
Let's Be Ritzy (1934) - Lt. Spaulding
The Love Captive (1934) - Dr. Collins
Such Women Are Dangerous (1934) - Delange
Handy Andy (1934) - McKechnie (uncredited)
Our Daily Bread (1934) - Louie
Beyond the Law (1934) - Morgan
The Girl from Missouri (1934) - Yacht Capt. Hawkins (uncredited)
British Agent (1934) - Col. Zwaboda (uncredited)
The Case of the Howling Dog (1934) - Judge Markham
A Lost Lady (1934) - State Attorney (uncredited)
The St. Louis Kid (1934) - Mr. Brown
Gentlemen Are Born (1934) - Martinson
Babbitt (1934) - District Attorney
365 Nights in Hollywood (1934) - Asst. D.A. (uncredited)
The White Cockatoo (1935) - David Lorn
Society Doctor (1935) - Harrigan
Home on the Range (1935) - Beady
Sweet Music (1935) - Mr. Thomas
A Dog of Flanders (1935) - Herr Herden
Black Fury (1935) - Government Man (uncredited)
Eight Bells (1935) - Tracey
G Men (1935) - Bruce J. Gregory
Alias Mary Dow (1935) - Martin
Dinky (1935) - District Attorney
Front Page Woman (1935) - District Attorney
The Crusades (1935) - Sentry (uncredited)
Here Comes the Band (1935) - Col. Wallace
Little Big Shot (1935) - Hank Gibbs
Freckles (1935) - Jack Carter
The Eagle's Brood (1935) - Big Henry
Frisco Kid (1935) - Coleman

The Walking Dead (1936)
Trailin' West (1936)
The Case of the Velvet Claws (1936)
China Clipper (1936)
Ready, Willing and Able (1937)
The Singing Marine (1937)
Smart Blonde (1937)
White Bondage (1937)
Black Legion (1937) - Prosecuting Attorney
Boys Town (1938)
Valley of the Giants (1938)
Flight to Fame (1938)
Andy Hardy Gets Spring Fever (1939)
Exile Express (1939)
Geronimo (1939)
Inside Information  (1939)
Man from Montreal (1939)
Whispering Enemies (1939)
Mystery of the White Room (1939)
The Lone Wolf Strikes (1940)
 South to Karanga (1940)
My Little Chickadee (1940) (uncredited)
The Man from Dakota (1940)
Northwest Passage (1940)
Charlie Chan in Panama (1940)
Edison, the Man (1940)
Ski Patrol (1940)
Andy Hardy Meets Debutante (1940)
Flight Command (1940)
Western Union (1941)
Forbidden Passage (1941, Short)
Andy Hardy's Private Secretary (1941)
Her First Beau (1941)
I Wanted Wings (1941)
The Great Lie (1941)
 Mutiny in the Arctic (1941)
Men of Boys Town (1941)
Texas (1941)
Secret Agent of Japan (1942)
A-Haunting We Will Go (1942)
Flying Tigers (1942)
The Pride of the Yankees (1942)
Underground Agent (1942)  
Adventures of the Flying Cadets (1943)
Air Force (1943)
The Mad Ghoul (1943)
Mystery Broadcast (1943)
A Guy Named Joe (1943)
The Fighting Seabees (1944)
The Mummy's Curse (1944)
Are These Our Parents? (1944)
Black Market Babies (1945)
The Adventures of Rusty (1945)
The Shanghai Cobra (1945)
Love Laughs at Andy Hardy (1946)
Rustlers (1949)
Henry, the Rainmaker (1949)
Davy Crockett, Indian Scout (1950)
Packard Motorcar Company "The Watchdogs" (1954) - Starring Addison Richards as an automotive engineerThe Ten Commandments (1956) - Fan BearerReprisal! (1956)Last of the Badmen (1957) - DillonThe Deerslayer (1957)Gunsight Ridge (1957) - Sheriff Tom JonesPerry Mason (1957) "The Case of the Angry Mourner" - Attorney George LansingThe Saga of Hemp Brown (1958) - Col. FordThe Californians (NBC-TV, 1958, Episode: "Dangerous Journey") - Thomas DurkinLassie (CBS-TV, 1958, Episode: "The Christmas Story") - Dr. WatkinsRawhide (CBS-TV, 1959, Episode: "Incident of the Dog Days") - Jed BlaineThe Oregon Trail (1959) - President James Polk (uncredited)All the Fine Young Cannibals (1960) - Mr. McDowall (uncredited)Inherit the Wind (1960) - Townsman (uncredited)The Dark at the Top of the Stairs (1960) - Harris (uncredited)The Facts of Life (1960) - Larry's Boss (uncredited)Frontier Uprising (1961) - Cmdr. KimballOperation Eichmann (1961) - The Stranger (uncredited)The Gambler Wore a Gun (1961) - Doc DevlinThe Flight That Disappeared (1961) - The SageBonanza (1961-1963, 3 episodes) - Dr. Paul Kay / Dr. HickmanSaintly Sinners (1962) - Monsignor CraigThe Raiders (1963) - Huntington LawfordFor Those Who Think Young'' (1964) - Dean Watkins

References

External links

Addison Richards at Turner Classic Movies 

1902 births
1964 deaths
American male film actors
American male television actors
American male stage actors
People from Zanesville, Ohio
Male actors from Los Angeles
Burials in California
20th-century American male actors